AppleShare is a discontinued product from Apple Computer which implements various network services. Its main purpose is to act as a file server, using the AFP protocol. Other network services implemented in later versions of AppleShare included a print server using the Printer Access Protocol (PAP), web server, electronic mail server, and SMB / CIFS server to support file sharing to Microsoft Windows clients.

Earlier versions of AppleShare supported only the AppleTalk network transport protocol but later versions, sold under the name AppleShare IP, allowed use of the TCP/IP protocol stack, as used on most modern networks. AppleShare provided three different protocols for application-layer services: AppleShare File Server, AppleShare Print Server and AppleShare PC.

AppleShare would operate with any physical network medium. Early installations used mainly LocalTalk (and more recently Ethernet), but any physical medium could be used which could be directly or indirectly connected to an AppleShare server system.

Equivalent third-party server products include the open-source Netatalk suite on Unix-like systems, and Services for Macintosh on Microsoft Windows NT and 2000. Versions of Mac OS from System 7 onwards included Personal File Sharing, which is a more limited AFP implementation. The most obvious difference between Personal File Sharing and AppleShare is that the former supports only a small number of concurrent remote users.

All versions of Mac OS were capable of acting as a client to an AppleShare server (via AFP and later SMB) over AppleTalk and TCP/IP protocols, although more recent versions of macOS have gradually removed support for AppleTalk in favor of standard TCP/IP. Third-party vendors created client software such as PC MACLAN (discontinued) and DAVE to implement client functionality on Windows systems. Other developers offered server software that provided similar functionality on Windows Servers such as GroupLogic ExtremeZ-IP and Cyan Software MacServerIP and NetATalk on Linux. Later versions of AppleShare also implemented the SMB and CIFS protocols which are the native file sharing protocols on Windows machines.

Apple discontinued the AppleShare product line following the release of macOS Server, which provides equivalent functionality.

System requirements
AppleShare (IP) support from 3.0.1 for Macintosh.

See also
 Disk sharing

References

Bibliography
 InfoWorld, 20 April 1987, page 62-64,

External links
 AppleShare Developer Documentation - from developer.apple.com
 AppleShare airs at last - Network World, page 4, 1987
 AppleShare and AppleShare IP File Sharing: Chart of All Limitations - from support.apple.com

Network file systems
Classic Mac OS
Apple Inc. file systems
Apple Inc. software
Network operating systems